Huot Vuthy is a Cambodian judge and member of the Khmer Rouge Tribunal. He is a professor of law at Norton University.

References

Living people
Cambodian judges
Year of birth missing (living people)
Khmer Rouge Tribunal judges
Place of birth missing (living people)